Antônio João is a municipality located in the Brazilian state of Mato Grosso do Sul. Its population was 9,020 (2020) and its area is 1,144 km².

References

Municipalities in Mato Grosso do Sul